The Frolic was a brig which sank northeast of Point Cabrillo, near Caspar, California.  Historians have called it "the most significant shipwreck on the west coast".  Its shipwreck site was listed on the National Register of Historic Places as Frolic (brig) in 1991.

The ship was built in Baltimore.

It was on return from trading in China with a load of porcelain and perhaps opium when it sank.

The opium-trading brig Frolic wrecked on a reef north of Point Cabrillo, a few miles from what is now Mendocino in 1850; the investigation of the wreck by agents of Henry Meiggs led to the discovery of the coast redwood forests of the Mendocino area and the beginning of the timber trade that would drive the local economy for decades. Mendocino itself was founded in 1852 as a logging community for what became the Mendocino Lumber Company, and was originally named Meiggsville after Meiggs.

A cannon salvaged by sport divers is now in Kelley House Museum in Mendocino.

The wreckage of the Frolic was supposedly rediscovered in 1984 and was the subject of a 2003 episode of the History Channel series Deep Sea Detectives entitled "Gold Rush Disaster: The Frolic".

Point Cabrillo and the Point Cabrillo Light can be seen in background of a 1986 photo of the exact location.

Gallery

References

External links

Shipwrecks
Archaeological sites in California
National Register of Historic Places in Mendocino County, California
Opium clippers
California Gold Rush
Maritime history of California